Ansata Ibn Halima (foaled 1958 in Egypt, died 1980), was a famous Arabian horse of Egyptian bloodlines who was imported from Egypt to the United States in 1959. A gray stallion, he was originally bred by the Egyptian Agricultural Organization (EAO), and imported by Donald and Judith Forbis of the Ansata Arabian Stud. He was a U.S. Top Ten Stallion in 1966, 1967, and 1969, as well as a sire of champion horses.

Pedigree

Notes

References

 

Individual Arabian and part-Arabian horses
1958 animal births
1980 animal deaths